

Medieval
 Johannes Ciconia (c. 1370–1412)

Renaissance
 Guillaume Dufay (1397–1474)
 Gilles Binchois (c. 1400–1460)
 Johannes Brassart (c. 1400/1405–1455)
 Johannes Ockeghem (c. 1410/1425–1497)
 Antoine Busnois (c. 1430–1492)
 Johannes Tinctoris (c. 1435–1511)
 Hayne van Ghizeghem (c.  1445–after 1476)
 Johannes de Stokem (c. 1445–1487 or 1501)
 Gaspar van Weerbeke (c. 1445–after 1516)
 Loyset Compère (c. 1445–1518)
 Alexander Agricola (1445/1446–1506)
 Matthaeus Pipelare (c. 1450–c. 1515)
 Heinrich Isaac (Henricus Ysaac) (c. 1450/1455–1517)
 Josquin des Prez (c. 1450/1455–1521)
 Pierre de la Rue (c. 1452–1518)
 Jacobus Barbireau (1455–1491)
 Jacob Obrecht (c. 1457/1458–1505)
 Antonius Divitis (Anthonius Rycke) (c. 1470–c. 1530)
 Adrian Willaert (c. 1490–1562)
 Johannes Ghiselin (Verbonnet) (fl. 1491–1507)
 Nicolas Gombert (c. 1495–c. 1560)
 Thomas Crecquillon (c. 1505–1557)
 Jean De Latre (c. 1505/1510–1569)
 Jacob Clemens non Papa (c. 1510/1515–c. 1555)
 Cipriano de Rore (1515/1516–1565)
 Hubert Waelrant (c. 1517–1595)
 Geert van Turnhout (c. 1520–1580)
 Philippus de Monte (1521–1603)
 Theodor Evertz (fl. c. 1554)
 Jacobus Vaet (c.  1529–1567)
 Jacobus de Kerle (1531/1532–1591)
 Orlandus Lassus (c. 1532–1594)
 Giaches de Wert (1535–1596)
 Jean de Castro (c. 1540–1611)
 Andreas Pevernage (1542/1543–1591)
 Alexander Utendal (1543/1545–1581)
 George de La Hèle (1547–1586)
 Emmanuel Adriaenssen (c. 1554–1604)
 Carolus Luython (1557–1620)
 Philippus Schoendorff (1558–1617)
 Cornelis Verdonck (1563–1625)

Baroque
 Peeter Cornet (c. 1570/1580–1633)
 Géry de Ghersem (1573/1575–1630)
 Léonard de Hodémont (c. 1575–1639)
 Mateo Romero (Mathieu Rosmarin) (c. 1575–1647)
 Guilielmus Messaus (1589–1640)
 Nicolaes a Kempis (c. 1600–1676)
 Henri Dumont (1610–1684)
 Jacques de Saint-Luc (1616–c. 1710)
 Abraham van den Kerckhoven (c. 1618–c. 1701)
 Gaspar Verlit (1622–1682)
 Daniel Danielis (1635–1696)
 Joannes Florentius a Kempis (1635–after 1711)
 Lambert Chaumont (c. 1635–1712)
 Carolus Hacquart (c. 1640–1701?)
  (1666–1727)
 Petrus Hercules Brehy (1673–1737)
 Jean-Baptiste Loeillet of London (John Loeillet) (1680–1730)
 Jacques Loeillet (1685–1748)
 Jean-Joseph Fiocco (1686–1746)
 Jean Baptiste Loeillet of Ghent (1688–c. 1720)
 Josse Boutmy (1697–1779)
 Joseph-Hector Fiocco (1703–1741)
 Henri-Jacques de Croes (1705–1786)
 Jean-Noël Hamal (1709–1778)

Classical
 Joseph Abaco (1710–1805)
  (1715–1790)
 Matthias Vanden Gheyn (1721–1785)
 Henri Moreau (composer) (1728–1803)
 Pieter van Maldere (1729–1768)
 François Joseph Gossec (1734–1829)
 André Ernest Modeste Grétry (1741–1813)
 Jérôme-Joseph de Momigny (1762–1842)

Romantic
 Martin-Joseph Mengal (1784–1851)
 François-Joseph Fétis (1784–1871)
 Nicolas Bosret (1799–1876)
  (1801–1873)
 Charles Auguste de Bériot (1802–1870)
 Karel-Louis (Charles-Louis) Hanssens (1802–1871)
 Albert Grisar (1808–1869)
 Jean-Baptiste Singelée (1812–1875)
 Félix Godefroid (1818–1897)
 Henri Vieuxtemps (1820–1881)
 César Franck (1822–1890)
 Jacques-Nicolas Lemmens (1823–1881)
  (1825–1894)
  (1826–1902)
 François-Auguste Gevaert (1828-1908)
 Désiré Magnus (1828–1884)
 Eduard Lassen (1830–1904)
 Peter Benoit (1834–1901)
 Jean-Théodore Radoux (1835–1911)
 Joseph Callaerts (1838–1901)
 Louis Brassin (1840–1884)
 Jan Blockx (1851–1912)
  (1851–1930)
 Edgar Tinel (1854–1912)
 Sylvain Dupuis (1856–1931)
 César Thomson (1857–1931)
 Eugène Ysaÿe (1858–1931)
 Ivan Caryll (1861–1921)
 Arthur De Greef (1862–1940)
 Théo Ysaÿe (1865–1918)
 Guillaume Lekeu (1870–1894)

Modern/Contemporary
 August de Boeck (1865–1937)
 Paul Gilson (1865–1942)
 Lodewijk Mortelmans (1868–1952)
 Joseph Ryelandt (1870–1965)
 Joseph Jongen (1873–1953)
 Flor Alpaerts (1876–1954)
 Albert Dupuis (1877–1967)
 Jean Rogister (1879–1964)
 Arthur Meulemans (1884–1966)
 Jef van Hoof (1886–1959)
  (1887–1977) 
  (1890–1961)
 Maurice Schoemaker (1890–1964)
  (1890–1981)
  (1891–1984)
  (1893–1971)
 Jean Absil (1893–1974)
 Emmanuel Durlet (1893–1977)
 Albert Huybrechts (1899–1938)
 André Souris (1899–1970)
 Marcel Poot (1901–1988)
  (1903–1975)
 Flor Peeters (1903–1986)
 Armand Preud'homme (1904–1986)
 René Bernier (1905–1984)
 Daniel Sternefeld (1905–1986)
  (1905–1988)
 Jef Maes (1905–1996)
  (1908–1991)
  (1908–1992)
  (1909–1985)
  (1912–1990)
  (1912–1998)
 Willy Ostijn (1913–1993)
 Maurice Vaute (1913–2000)
 Ernest van der Eyken (1913–2010)
 Pierre Froidebise (1914–1962)
 Marcel Quinet (1915–1986)
 Victor Legley (1915–1994)
  (born 1920)
  (born 1921)
 Karel Goeyvaerts (1923–1993)
  (1923–2000)
  (1925–1985)
 Yolande Uyttenhove (1925–2000)
  (1927–2008)
  (1928–1999)
 Willem Kersters (1929–1998)
 Philibert Mees (1929–2006)
 Henri Pousseur (1929–2009)
 Didier van Damme (born 1929)
 Frédéric Devreese (1929–2020)
  (born 1929)
  (1930–2006)
 Jacqueline Fontyn (born 1930)
 Lucien Goethals (1931–2006)
 André Laporte (born 1931)
  (born 1931)
  (born 1932)
  (1935–2005)
 Philippe Boesmans (born 1936)
 Frans Geysen (born 1936)
 Pierre Bartholomée (born 1937)
 André Waignein (born 1942)
  (born 1949)
 Carl Verbraeken (born 1950)
  (born 1951)
  (1952–2011)
  (born 1952)
Lucien Posman (born 1952)
 Godfried-Willem Raes (born 1952)
 Wim Mertens (born 1953)
 Jan Van der Roost (born 1956)
 Nicholas Lens (born 1957)
  (born 1957)
 Luc Brewaeys (1959–2015)
 Dirk Brossé (born 1960)
  (born 1960)
 Wim Henderickx (1962–2022)
  (born 1967)
 Pierre Kolp (born 1969)
 Annelies Van Parys (born 1975) 

Belgian
 
Composers, Classical
Belgian music-related lists